Hebeloma fusisporum is a species of mushroom in the family Hymenogastraceae.

fusisporum
Fungi of Europe